A figure of speech or rhetorical figure is a word or phrase that intentionally deviates from ordinary language use in order to produce a rhetorical effect. Figures of speech are traditionally classified into schemes, which vary the ordinary sequence of words, and tropes, where words carry a meaning other than what they ordinarily signify. 

An example of a scheme is a polysyndeton: the repetition of a conjunction before every element in a list, whereas the conjunction typically would appear only before the last element, as in "Lions and tigers and bears, oh my!"—emphasizing the danger and number of animals more than the prosaic wording with only the second "and". An example of a trope is the metaphor, describing one thing as something that it clearly is not in order to lead the mind to compare them, in "All the world's a stage."

Four rhetorical operations 

Classical rhetoricians classified figures of speech into four categories or :

 addition, also called repetition/expansion/superabundance
 omission, also called subtraction/abridgement/lack
 transposition, also called transferring
 permutation, also called switching/interchange/substitution/transmutation

These categories are often still used. The earliest known text listing them, though not explicitly as a system, is the Rhetorica ad Herennium, of unknown authorship, where they are called —addition), —permutation). Quintillian then mentioned them in Institutio Oratoria. Philo of Alexandria also listed them as addition.

Examples 
Figures of speech come in many varieties. The aim is to use the language inventively to accentuate the effect of what is being said. A few examples follow:

 "Round and round the rugged rocks the ragged rascal ran" is an example of alliteration, where the consonant r is used repeatedly. "Sister Suzy‘s sewing socks for soldiers" is a particular form of alliteration called sibilance, repeating an s sound. Both are commonly used in poetry.

 "She would run up the stairs and then a new set of curtains" is a variety of zeugma called a syllepsis. Run up can refer either to a quick ascent or to manufacture. The effect is enhanced by the momentary suggestion, through a pun, that she might be climbing the curtains. The ellipsis or omission of the second use of the verb makes the reader think harder about what is being said.
 "Painful pride" is an oxymoron, where two contradictory ideas are placed in the same sentence.
"An Einstein" is an example of synecdoche, as it uses a particular name to represent a class of people: geniuses.
 "I had butterflies in my stomach" is a metaphor, referring to a nervous feeling as if there were flying insects in one's stomach.
To say "it was like having some butterflies in my stomach" would be a simile, because it uses the word like which is missing in the metaphor.
To say "It was like having a butterfly farm in my stomach", "It felt like a butterfly farm in my stomach", or "I was so nervous that I had a butterfly farm in my stomach" could be a hyperbole, because it is exaggerated.
"That filthy place was really dirty" is an example of tautology, as there are the two words ('filthy' and 'dirty') having almost the same meaning and are repeated so as to make the text more emphatic.

Types 
Scholars of classical Western rhetoric have divided figures of speech into two main categories: schemes and tropes. Schemes (from the Greek , 'form or shape') are figures of speech that change the ordinary or expected pattern of words. For example, the phrase, "John, my best friend" uses the scheme known as apposition. Tropes (from Greek , 'to turn') change the general meaning of words. An example of a trope is irony, which is the use of words to convey the opposite of their usual meaning ("For Brutus is an honorable man; / So are they all, all honorable men").

During the Renaissance, scholars meticulously enumerated and classified figures of speech. Henry Peacham, for example, in his The Garden of Eloquence (1577), enumerated 184 different figures of speech. Professor Robert DiYanni, in his book Literature: Reading Fiction, Poetry, Drama and the Essay wrote: "Rhetoricians have catalogued more than 250 different figures of speech, expressions or ways of using words in a nonliteral sense."

For simplicity, this article divides the figures between schemes and tropes, but does not further sub-classify them (e.g., "Figures of Disorder"). Within each category, words are listed alphabetically. Most entries link to a page that provides greater detail and relevant examples, but a short definition is placed here for convenience. Some of those listed may be considered rhetorical devices, which are similar in many ways.

Schemes 
Schemes are words or phrases whose syntax, sequence, or pattern occurs in a manner that varies from an ordinary usage.
 Accumulatio: accumulating arguments in a concise forceful manner.
 Alliteration: the occurrence of the same letter or sound at the beginning of adjacent or closely connected words.
 Example: "She sells sea shells by the sea shore".
 Anacoluthon: transposition of clauses to achieve an unnatural order in a sentence.
 Anadiplosis: repetition of a word at the end of a clause and then at the beginning of its succeeding clause.
 Anaphora: the repetition of a word or phrase at the beginning of successive clauses.
 Anastrophe: changing the object, subject and verb order in a clause.
 Anti-climax: an abrupt descent (either deliberate or unintended) on the part of a speaker or writer from the dignity of idea which he appeared to be aiming at.
 Example: "People, pets, batteries, ... all are dead."
 Anthimeria: transformation of a word of a certain word class to another word class.
 Antimetabole: a sentence consisting of the repetition of words in successive clauses, but in reverse order.
 Antithesis: juxtaposition of opposing or contrasting ideas.
 Aphorismus: statement that calls into question the definition of a word.
 Aposiopesis: breaking off or pausing speech for dramatic or emotional effect.
 Assonance: repetition of vowel sounds: "Smooth move!" or "Please leave!" or "That's the fact Jack!"
 Asyndeton: omission of conjunctions between related clauses.
 Chiasmus: two or more clauses are related to each other through a reversal of structures in order to make a larger point.
 Climax: arrangement of words in an ascending order.
 Consonance: repetition of consonant sounds, most commonly within a short passage of verse.
 Correlative verse: matching items in two sequences.
 Diacope: repetition of a word or phrase with one or two intervening words.
 Ellipsis: omission of words.
 Elision: omission of one or more letters in speech, making it colloquial.
 Enallage: wording ignoring grammatical rules or conventions.
 Epanalepsis: ending sentences with their beginning.
 Epistrophe (also known as antistrophe): repetition of the same word or group of words at the end of successive clauses. The counterpart of anaphora.
 Epizeuxis: repetition of a single word, with no other words in between.
 Hendiadys: use of two nouns to express an idea when it normally would consist of an adjective and a noun.
 Hendiatris: use of three nouns to express one idea.
 Homeoteleuton: words with the same ending.
 Hypallage: a transferred epithet from a conventional choice of wording.
 Hyperbaton: two ordinary associated words are detached. The term may also be used more generally for all different figures of speech which transpose natural word order in sentences.
 Hyperbole: an exaggeration of a statement.
 Hypozeuxis: every clause having its own independent subject and predicate.
 Hysteron proteron: the inversion of the usual temporal or causal order between two elements.
 Isocolon: use of parallel structures of the same length in successive clauses.
 Internal rhyme: using two or more rhyming words in the same sentence.
 Kenning: using a compound word neologism to form a metonym.
 Litotes: an understatement achieved by negating the opposite statement, such as "not too bad" for "very good", or "she is not a beauty queen" for "she is ugly", yielding an ironical effect.
 Merism: referring to a whole by enumerating some of its parts.
 Onomatopoeia: word that imitates a real sound (e.g. tick-tock or boom).
 Paradiastole: repetition of the disjunctive pair "neither" and "nor".
 Parallelism: the use of similar structures in two or more clauses.
 Paraprosdokian: an utterance in which the same word is used with two different meanings, creating a pun.
 Paroemion: alliteration in which every word in a sentence or phrase begins with the same letter.
 Pleonasm: the use of more words than are needed to express meaning.
 Polyptoton: repetition of words derived from the same root.
 Polysyndeton: close repetition of conjunctions.
 Pun: when a word or phrase is used in two (or more) different senses.
 Sibilance: repetition of letter 's', it is a form of consonance.
 Spoonerism: switching place of syllables within two words in a sentence yielding amusement.
 Syncope: omission of parts of a word or phrase.
 Symploce: simultaneous use of anaphora and epistrophe: the repetition of the same word or group of words at the beginning and the end of successive clauses.
 Synchysis: words that are intentionally scattered to create perplexment.
 Synecdoche: referring to a part by its whole or vice versa.
 Synonymia: use of two or more synonyms in the same clause or sentence.
 Tautology: redundancy due to superfluous qualification; saying the same thing twice.
 Tmesis: insertions of content within a compound word.
 Zeugma: the using of one verb for two or more actions.

Tropes 
Tropes are words or phrases whose contextual meaning differs from the manner or sense in which they are ordinarily used.
 Accismus: expressing the want of something by denying it.
 Adynaton: an extreme form of hyperbole (exaggeration). It the opposite of understatement.
 Allegory: a metaphoric narrative in which the literal elements indirectly reveal a parallel story of symbolic or abstract significance.
 Allusion: covert reference to another work of literature or art.
 Anacoenosis: posing a question to an audience, often with the implication that it shares a common interest with the speaker.
 Analogy: a comparison between two things, typically for the purpose of explanation or clarification.
 Anapodoton: leaving a common known saying unfinished.
 Antanaclasis: a form of pun in which a word is repeated in two different senses.
 Anthimeria: a substitution of one part of speech for another, such as noun for a verb and vice versa.
 Anthropomorphism: ascribing human characteristics to something that is not human, such as an animal or a god (see zoomorphism).
 Antiphrasis: a name or a phrase used ironically.
 Antistasis: repetition of a word in a different sense.
 Antonomasia: substitution of a proper name for a phrase or vice versa.
 Aphorism: briefly phrased, easily memorable statement of a truth or opinion, an adage.
 Aporia: faked or sincere puzzled questioning.
 Apophasis: (Invoking) an idea by denying its (invocation), also known as occupatio or paralipsis.
 Apostrophe: when an actor or speaker addresses an absent third party, often a personified abstraction or inanimate object.
 Archaism: use of an obsolete, archaic word (a word used in olden language, e.g. Shakespeare's language).
 Bathos: pompous speech with a ludicrously mundane worded anti-climax.
 Burlesque metaphor: an amusing, overstated or grotesque comparison or example.
 Catachresis: blatant misuse of words or phrases.
 Cliché: overused phrase or theme.
 Dysphemism: substitution of a harsher, more offensive, or more disagreeable term for another. Opposite of euphemism.
 Ekphrasis: lively describing something you see, often a painting.
 Epanorthosis: immediate and emphatic self-correction, often following a slip of the tongue.
 Epicrisis: mentioning a saying and then commenting on it.
 Epiplexis: rhetorical question displaying disapproval or debunks.
 Epitrope: initially pretending to agree with an opposing debater or invite one to do something.
 Euphemism: substitution of a less offensive or more agreeable term for another.
 Exclamation: a loud calling or crying out.
 Hyperbaton: words that naturally belong together separated from each other for emphasis or effect.
 Hyperbole: use of exaggerated terms for emphasis.
 Hypocatastasis: an implication or declaration of resemblance that does not directly name both terms.
 Hypophora: answering one's own rhetorical question at length.
 Hysteron proteron: reversal of anticipated order of events; a form of hyperbaton.
 Illeism: the act of referring to oneself in the third person instead of first person. 
 Innuendo: having a hidden meaning in a sentence that makes sense whether it is detected or not.
 Irony: use of word in a way that conveys a meaning opposite to its usual meaning.
 Litotes: emphasizing the magnitude of a statement by denying its opposite.
 Malapropism: using a word through confusion with a word that sounds similar.
 Meiosis: use of understatement, usually to diminish the importance of something.
 Merism: referring to a whole by enumerating some of its parts.
 Metalepsis: figurative speech is used in a new context.
 Metaphor: an implied comparison between two things, attributing the properties of one thing to another that it does not literally possess.
 Metonymy: a thing or concept is called not by its own name but rather by the name of something associated in meaning with that thing or concept.
 Neologism: the use of a word or term that has recently been created, or has been in use for a short time. Opposite of archaism.
 Nosism: the practice of using the pronoun we to refer to oneself when expressing a personal opinion.
 Non sequitur: statement that bears no relationship to the context preceding.
 Onomatopoeia: words that sound like their meaning.
 Oxymoron: using two terms together, that normally contradict each other.
 Par'hyponoian: replacing in a phrase or text a second part, that would have been logically expected.
 Parable: extended metaphor told as an anecdote to illustrate or teach a moral lesson.
 Paradiastole: extenuating a vice in order to flatter or soothe.
 Paradox: use of apparently contradictory ideas to point out some underlying truth.
 Paraprosdokian: phrase in which the latter part causes a rethinking or reframing of the beginning.
 Parody: humouristic imitation.
 Paronomasia: pun in which similar-sounding words but words having a different meaning are used.
 Pathetic fallacy: ascribing human conduct and feelings to nature.
 Personification: attributing or applying human qualities to inanimate objects, animals, or natural phenomena.
 Pleonasm: the use of more words than is necessary for clear expression.
 Procatalepsis: refuting anticipated objections as part of the main argument.
 Proslepsis: extreme form of paralipsis in which the speaker provides great detail while feigning to pass over a topic.
 Proverb: succinct or pithy, often metaphorical, expression of wisdom commonly believed to be true.
 Pun: play on words that will have two meanings.
 Rhetorical question: asking a question as a way of asserting something. Asking a question which already has the answer hidden in it. Or asking a question not for the sake of getting an answer but for asserting something (or as in a poem for creating a poetic effect).
 Satire: humoristic criticism of society.
 Sesquipedalianism: use of long and obscure words.
 Simile: comparison between two things using like or as.
 Snowclone: alteration of cliché or phrasal template.
 Syllepsis: the use of a word in its figurative and literal sense at the same time or a single word used in relation to two other parts of a sentence although the word grammatically or logically applies to only one.
 Synecdoche: form of metonymy, referring to a part by its whole, or a whole by its part.
 Synesthesia: description of one kind of sense impression by using words that normally describe another.
 Tautology: superfluous repetition of the same sense in different words Example: The children gathered in a round circle
 Truism: a self-evident statement.
 Tricolon diminuens: combination of three elements, each decreasing in size.
 Tricolon crescens: combination of three elements, each increasing in size.
 Zeugma: use of a single verb to describe two or more actions.
 Zoomorphism: applying animal characteristics to humans or gods.

See also 

 Idiom
 List of forms of word play
 Repetition (rhetorical device)
 Rhetorical device
 Stylistic device

References

Citations

Sources 

 Baldrick, Chris. 2008. Oxford Dictionary of Literary Terms. Oxford University Press. New York. .
 Corbett, Edward P. J. and Connors, Robert J. 1999. Style and Statement. Oxford University Press. New York, Oxford. .
 Kennedy, X.J. et al. 2006. The Longman Dictionary of Literary Terms: Vocabulary for the Informed Reader. Pearson, Longman. New York. .
 Forsyth, Mark. 2014. The Elements of Eloquence. Berkley Publishing Group/Penguin Publishing. New York. .
 Quinn, Edward. 1999. A Dictionary of Literary and Thematic Terms. Checkmark Books. New York. .

External links

 Figure of speech by theidioms.com

 
Rhetoric